Peter Rysbrack can refer to:

Pieter Rijsbraeck (1655–1729), a Flemish painter
Pieter Andreas Rijsbrack (1685 or 1690–1748), a Flemish painter and son of Pieter Rijsbraeck